Survival Skills is a 2020 American comedy horror thriller film directed by Quinn Armstrong, starring Stacy Keach, Vayu O'Donnell, and Spencer Garrett. It takes the form of a lost police training video VHS from the 1980s. The story follows the "fictional" character of Jim, the perfect cop, who becomes self-aware and disillusioned with his police training before taking matters into his own hands.

Survival Skills premiered at the Cinequest Film Festival on March 6, 2020. It is set for VOD release in the US by Cranked Up Films on December 4, 2020.

References

External links

2020 films
2020 comedy horror films
2020 horror thriller films
American comedy horror films
American horror thriller films
2020s comedy thriller films
2020s English-language films
2020s American films